Zakręt may refer to the following places:
Zakręt, Otwock County in Masovian Voivodeship (east-central Poland)
Zakręt, Pułtusk County in Masovian Voivodeship (east-central Poland)
Zakręt, Warmian-Masurian Voivodeship (north Poland)
Zakręt, historical name of the location now known as the Vingis Park, Lithuania